The term New Adventures can refer to:

New Adventures (dance company), a British dance company
New Adventures (Dutch band), a Dutch rock and roll band from the 1980s
New Adventures (British band), a British band from the 2000s
New Adventures of Queen Victoria, a web comic
New Adventures of a Yankee in King Arthur's Court, a 1988 Soviet film
New Adventures of Get Rich Quick Wallingford, a 1931 US film
New Adventures of Lucky Luke, a book in the Lucky Luke series
New Adventures in Hi-Fi, an album by US rock band REM
New Adventure Island, a game
The New Adventures of Winnie the Pooh, an animated TV series